José Pérez Mier (born 10 October 1928) is a Mexican modern pentathlete and fencer. He competed in the modern pentathlon at the 1952, 1956 and 1960 Summer Olympics. He also competed in the team épée fencing event at the 1960 Games.

References

External links
 

1928 births
Living people
Mexican male épée fencers
Mexican male modern pentathletes
Olympic fencers of Mexico
Olympic modern pentathletes of Mexico
Sportspeople from Morelia
Modern pentathletes at the 1952 Summer Olympics
Modern pentathletes at the 1956 Summer Olympics
Modern pentathletes at the 1960 Summer Olympics
Fencers at the 1960 Summer Olympics
Pan American Games gold medalists for Mexico
Pan American Games medalists in modern pentathlon
Pan American Games bronze medalists for Mexico
Modern pentathletes at the 1955 Pan American Games
Competitors at the 1959 Pan American Games
Modern pentathletes at the 1963 Pan American Games
Medalists at the 1955 Pan American Games
Medalists at the 1959 Pan American Games
Medalists at the 1963 Pan American Games
20th-century Mexican people
21st-century Mexican people